Werner Kohlmeyer (19 April 1924 – 26 March 1974) was a German footballer who played as a full back.

He was part of the West German team that won the 1954 FIFA World Cup. In total he earned 22 caps for West Germany. He also played for 1. FC Kaiserslautern from 1941 to 1957.

Career
Kohlmeyer was born in Kaiserslautern.

The burly Kohlmeyer became renowned for saves on the goalline, especially in the game against Yugoslavia during the 1954 World Cup, in which he several times none to soon threw himself into shots on the German goal. In the 1954 FIFA World Cup Final, Kohlmeyer stopped Zoltán Czibor.

Kohlmeyer won the German football championship with 1. FC Kaiserslautern in 1951 and 1953. In one of his last games for Germany, Kohlmeyer faced Stanley Matthews at Wembley on 1 December 1954, in an international friendly between England and West Germany. While he proved incapable of stopping Matthews and clearly lost that duel, Kohlmeyer was proud that he never lost his composure by committing not a single foul on Matthews. It was this attitude of fairness which Germany coach Sepp Herberger appreciated, as well as Kohlmeyer's assuredness and defensive reliability.

Kohlmeyer remained a starter for Kaiserslautern until 1957. After retirement he suffered from a divorce and the detachment from his three children as well as alcoholism and poverty; he lived on welfare for a while, before taking a job as a doorman for a newspaper publisher in Mainz. He died at the age of 49 due to heart failure in Mainz-Mombach.

References

External links
 
 
 

1924 births
1974 deaths
People from Kaiserslautern
People from the Palatinate (region)
Footballers from Rhineland-Palatinate
German footballers
Association football defenders
Germany international footballers
1954 FIFA World Cup players
FIFA World Cup-winning players
1. FC Kaiserslautern players
FC 08 Homburg players